The 2003 Tunis Four Nations Tournament It is an international friendly football tournament held in Radès, Tunisia, at the Stade 7 November, with the participation of four teams: Cameroon, Ghana, Madagascar and Tunisia. Tunisia won the tournament after defeating Cameroon in the final.

Participants 
The participants were:

Venue

Results

Semifinals

Third place match

Final

Goalscorers 
There were 13 goals scored in 4 matches, for an average of 3.25 goals per match.

3 goals

  Charles Amoah

1 goal

  Samuel Eto'o
  Joseph-Désiré Job
  Stephen Appiah
  Baffour Gyan
  Hervé Rado Rasonaivo
  Norbert Randriandelison
  Riadh Bouazizi
  Imed Mhedhebi
  Nabil Missaoui

Own goal

  Michael Essien (against Madagascar)

External links 

 Details at RSSSF

References 

International association football competitions hosted by Tunisia
African Cup of Nations
Tunis Four Nations Tournament